The following is a list of notable people from Lithuania's capital city of Vilnius (historically known by the names of Vilna/Wilna/Wilno). It includes people who were born or resided there.

A
 Neringa Aidietytė (born 1983), athlete
 Frantsishak Alyakhnovich (1883–1944), Belarusian playwright and journalist
 Algirdas (1296–1377), Grand Duke of Lithuania
 Ana Ambrazienė (born 1955), hurdler, former world record holder
 Michał Elwiro Andriolli (1836–1893), Polish-Lithuanian painter and architect of Italian descent
 Irena Andriukaitienė (born 1948), politician and signature of the Act of the Re-Establishment of the State of Lithuania
 Mark Antokolsky (1843–1902), Russian-Jewish sculptor
 Laura Asadauskaitė (born 1984), modern pentathlon athlete

B
 Francišak Bahuševič (1840–1900), Belarusian poet
 Živilė Balčiūnaitė (born 1979), long-distance runner, European champion
 Aidas Bareikis (born 1967), artist
 Liutauras Barila (born 1974), Olympic biathlete
 Jonas Basanavičius (1851–1927), leader of Lithuania's national revival movement
 Ričardas Berankis (born 1990), the top ranked Lithuanian tennis player of all time
 Alexander Berkman (1870–1936), leading member of the anarchist movement in the early 20th century
 Mykolas Biržiška (1882–1962), historian of literature, politician, signer of the Act of Independence of Lithuania
 Vaclovas Biržiška (1884–1956), publisher, historian
 Eglė Bogdanienė (born 1962), textile artist
 Kazys Bradūnas (1917–2009), poet
 Algirdas Brazauskas (1932–2010), Lithuanian President and Prime Minister
 Danutė Budreikaitė (born 1953), politician and Member of the European Parliament
 Kanstancyja Bujło(1893–1986), Belarusian poet and playwright
 Teodor Bujnicki (1907–1944), Polish poet
 Vaidas Baumila (1987), Lithuanian singer and actor.

C
 Saint Casimir (1458–1484), patron saint of Poland and Lithuania
 Dalius Čekuolis (born 1959), politician
 Jan Karol Chodkiewicz (1560–1621), politician and hetman.
 César Cui (1835–1918), Russian composer and music critic of French, Polish and Lithuanian descent

D
 Ingeborga Dapkūnaitė (born 1963), actress
 Simonas Daukantas (1793–1864), historian
 Mikalojus Daukša (1527–1613), publisher of the first printed Lithuanian book in GDL
 Boris Dekanidze (1962–1995), stateless crime boss
 Gintaras Didžiokas (born 1966), politician
 Ignacy Domeyko (1802–1889), geologist and engineer
 Raminta Dvariškytė (born 1990), Olympic swimmer
 Dynoro, (born 1999), DJ and musical producer
 Felix Dzerzhinsky (1877–1926), founder of the Soviet secret police
 Audrius Dzikaras (born 1957), painter

F
Viktorija Faith (1986), singer, songwriter, producer, actress
Yechezkel Feivel (1755–1833), Maggid
Eduard Robert Flegel (1855–1886) a German explorer, role in the Scramble for Africa.

G
 Romain Gary (1914–1980), French writer
 Martynas Gecevičius (born 1988), basketball player
 Gediminas (–1341), Grand Duke of Lithuania, founder of Vilnius city.
 Petras Geniušas (born 1961), classical pianist
 Marija Gimbutas (1921–1994), archeologist
 Rolandas Gimbutis (born 1981), swimmer
 Liudas Gira (1884–1946), poet, writer, and literary critic
 Johann Christoph Glaubitz (–1767), architect
 Kęstutis Glaveckas (1949–2021), politician and signature of the Act of the Re-Establishment of the State of Lithuania
Alexander Goldberg, (1906-1985) Israeli chemical engineer and President of the Technion – Israel Institute of Technology
 Judah Leib Gordon (1830–1892), an important Hebrew poet of the Jewish Enlightenment.
 Antoni Gorecki (1787–1861), writer, poet, soldier
 Albertas Goštautas (–1539), Chancellor of Grand Duchy of Lithuania
 Mindaugas Griškonis (born 1986), Olympic rower
 Hubertas Grušnys (1961–2006), media proprietor, in 1989 launched the first-ever private radio station in Lithuania and the post-communist Eastern Europe
 Dalia Grybauskaitė (born 1956), President of Lithuania
 Laurynas Gucevičius (1753–1798), architect
 Daina Gudzinevičiūtė (born 1965), shooter, Olympic gold medalist
 Asmik Grigorian (born 1981), operatic soprano, named as the best female singer in International Opera Awards 2019
 Mirga Gražinytė-Tyla (born 1986), conductor, music director of the City of Birmingham Symphony Orchestra (CBSO) in England

H
 Menahem Manesh Hayyut (died 1636), rabbi
 Jascha Heifetz (1901–1987), violinist

I
 Juozas Imbrasas (born 1941), former mayor of Vilnius
 Jurga Ivanauskaitė (1961–2007), writer

J
 Edgaras Jankauskas (born 1975), first Lithuanian footballer to win the UEFA Champions League in 2004
 Gintaras Januševičius (born 1985), pianist
 Simas Jasaitis (born 1982), basketball player
 Rolandas Jasevičius (born 1982), boxer
 Paweł Jasienica (1909–1970), Polish historian, journalist and soldier
 Jakub Jasiński (1761–1794), Polish general
 Władysław II Jagiełło (–1434), Grand Duke of Lithuania.
 Arvydas Juozaitis (born 1956), swimmer, Olympic bronze medalist
 Eglė Jurgaitytė (born 1998), singer

K
 Virgilijus Kačinskas (born 1959), architect and politician, signed the Act of the Re-Establishment of the State of Lithuania
 Lina Kačiušytė (born 1963), swimmer, Olympic gold medalist
 Zebi Hirsch Kaidanover (c. 1650–1712), rabbi and writer
 Saint Raphael Kalinowski (1835–1907), Polish Discalced Carmelite friar inside the Russian partition of Polish-Lithuanian Commonwealth; teacher, engineer, prisoner of war, royal tutor and priest
 Ihnat Kančeŭski (pen name: Ihnat Abdziralovič), (1896-1923), Belarusian poet, philosopher and publicist.
 Mieczysław Karłowicz (1876–1909), Polish composer and conductor
 Rimantas Kaukėnas (born 1977), basketball player
 Antanas Kavaliauskas (born 1984), professional basketball player, 2005 FIBA Under-21 World Championship gold medalist
 Valdas Kazlauskas (born 1958), athlete and coach
 Vytautas Kernagis (1951–2008), singer-songwriter, considered a pioneer of Lithuanian sung poetry
 Rebeka Kim (born 1998), South Korean figure skater
 Gediminas Kirkilas (born 1951), former Prime Minister of Lithuania
 Szymon Konarski (1808–1839), Polish radical democratic politician and revolutionary
 Oskaras Koršunovas (born 1969), theatre director
 Simon Kovar (born Kovarski) (1890–1970), bassoonist
 Boris Kowerda (1907–1987), anti-Soviet Belarusian activist convicted of murdering Pyotr Voykov, Soviet ambassador to Poland in Warsaw in 1927.
 Saint Maria Faustina Kowalska (1905–1938), Polish Roman Catholic nun and mystic
 Józef Ignacy Kraszewski (1812–1887), Polish writer, historian, journalist, scholar, painter and author.
 Andrius Kubilius (born 1956), Prime Minister of Lithuania
 Jonas Kubilius (1921–2011), mathematician who works in probability theory and number theory
 Abraomas Kulvietis (–1545), reformer, publicist
 Jolanta Kvašytė (born 1956 Vilnius), ceramic artist
Nomeda Kazlaus, (born 1974), opera singer appearing internationally, TV Host
Rita Karin (1919–1993), Polish-born American actress

L 
 Bernard Ładysz (1922–2020), Polish bass-baritone and actor
 Vytautas Landsbergis (born 1932), politician, contributed to the demise of the Soviet Union
 Joachim Lelewel (1786–1861), Polish historian.
 Jacob Liboschütz (1741–1827), physician 
 Romas Lileikis (born 1959), poet, musician, film director
 Michalo Lituanus, (ca.1500-ca.1550) unidentified humanist author of the 16th century
 Eduard Lobau (born 1988), Belarusian activist with the nation's democracy movement
 Józef Łukaszewicz (1863–1928), Polish physicist, geologist and mineralogist
 Meilė Lukšienė (1913–2009), cultural historian and activist
 Jolanta Lothe (1942–2022), Polish actress

M
 Józef Mackiewicz (1902–1985), Polish writer
 Hillel Noah Maggid (1829–1903), Jewish historian 
 Andrius Mamontovas (born 1967), singer
 Gritė Maruškevičiūtė (born 1989), Miss Lithuania 2010
 Raimundas Mažuolis (born 1972), swimmer, olympic medalist
  (born 1954), lawyer
 Adam Mickiewicz (1798–1855), Polish poet.
 Jeronimas Milius (born 1984), singer
 Czesław Miłosz (1911–2004), Polish poet, Nobel prize in Literature
 Lazar Minor (1855–1942), Russian neurologist
 Vytautas Miškinis (born 1954), music composer and professor
 Gediminas Motuza (born 1946), geologist and author of geology textbooks
 Yana Maksimava (born 1989), Lithuanian-Belarusian heptathlete
 Andrius Mamontovas (born 1967), Lithuanian rock musician.

N
 Onutė Narbutaitė (born 1956), composer
 Ludwik Narbutt (1832–1863), military commander
 Teodor Narbutt (1784–1864), historian
 Eimuntas Nekrošius (1952–2018), theatre director
 Henryk Niewodniczański (1900–1968), physicist

O
Nijolė Oželytė-Vaitiekūnienė (born 1954), actress, signed the Act of the Re-Establishment of the State of Lithuania

P
 Bohdan Paczyński (1940–2007), astronomer
 Rolandas Paksas (born 1956), former Lithuanian president and mayor of Vilnius
 Jerzy Passendorfer (1923–2003), Polish film director
 Artūras Paulauskas (born 1953), former speaker of the Lithuanian Seimas
 Józef Piłsudski (1867–1935), politician, military commander and Polish head of state
 Emilia Plater (1806–1831), Polish revolutionary and female military commander
 Kazimierz Plater (1915–2004), Polish chess master
 Martynas Pocius (born 1986), professional basketball player, has played for Lithuania 
 Karol Podczaszyński (1790–1860), Polish architect
 Romualdas Požerskis (born 1951), photographer
 Daniel Prenn (1904–1991), Russian-born German, Polish, and British world-top-ten tennis player
 Airinė Palšytė (born 1992), Lithuanian high jumper

R
 Antoni Radziwiłł (1775–1833), Polish and Prussian noble, aristocrat, musician and politician
 Barbara Radziwiłł (Barbora Radvilaitė) (1520–1551), Queen of Polish-Lithuanian Commonwealth
 Clara Rockmore (1911–1998), classical violin prodigy and a virtuoso performer of the theremin
 Michał Pius Römer (1880–1945), rector of Vytautas Magnus University, lawyer
 Michał Józef Römer (1778–1853), writer and politician
 Maria Roszak (1908–2018), Polish nun awarded Righteous Among the Nations
 Audrius Rudys (born 1951), economist, politician, signed the Act of the Re-Establishment of the State of Lithuania
 Ferdynand Ruszczyc (1870–1936), painter

S
 Kristina Sabaliauskaitė (born 1974), writer and art historian
 Lew Sapieha (1557–1633), politician and military commander
 Maciej Kazimierz Sarbiewski (1595–1640), poet
 Šarūnas Sauka (born 1958), postmodern painter
 Andrew Schally (born 1926), Polish-American endocrinologist and Nobel Prize laureate 
 Kalman Schulman (1819–1899), Jewish writer and translator 
 Žydrūnas Savickas (born 1975), Strongman champion
 Lasar Segall (1891–1957), Brazilian Jewish painter, engraver and sculptor
 Kazimierz Siemienowicz (c. 1600 – c. 1651), military commander, engineer, theorist of artillery and pioneer of rocketry
Deividas Sirvydis (born 2000), basketball player in the NBA
 Konstantinas Sirvydas (1579–1631), lexicographer, writer
 Piotr Skarga (1536–1612), theologian, writer and the first rector of the Wilno Academy.
 Francysk Skaryna (c. 1490 – 1552), publisher of first printed Ruthenian Bible
 Boris Skossyreff (1896–1989), King of Andorra
 Mykolas Sleževičius (1882–1939), lawyer, Prime Minister of Lithuania
 Juliusz Słowacki (1809–1849), Polish poet
 Antanas Smetona (1874–1944), publicist, President of Lithuanian Republic
 Elijah ben Solomon, Gaon mi Vilna (1720–1797), Jewish scholar and Kabbalist
 Blessed Michał Sopoćko (1888–1975), Apostle of Divine Mercy
 Jędrzej Śniadecki (1768–1838), chemist, biologist and philosopher
 Audrius Stonys (born 1966), renowned documentary filmmaker
 Vytautas Straižys (born 1936), astronomer, developer of Vilnius photometric system
 Władysław Syrokomla (1823–1862), Polish poet, writer and translator
 Deividas Šemberas (born 1978), football player
 Algirdas Šemeta (born 1962), economist and the European Commissioner for Taxation and Customs Union, Audit and Anti-Fraud
 Stasys Šilingas (1885–1962), lawyer and statesman, a significant figure in the history of Lithuania's independence
 Tadas Šuškevičius (born 1985), athlete

T
 Emanuel Tanay (1928–2014), Holocaust survivor and American forensic psychiatrist
 Aurimas Taurantas (born 1956), politician and signature of the Act of the Re-Establishment of the State of Lithuania
 Yemima Tchernovitz-Avidar (1909–1998), Israeli author
 Auksė Treinytė (born 1952), Lithuanian former sport shooter
 Eustachy Tyszkiewicz (1814–1873), historian

V
 Moi Ver (1904–1995), photographer and painter
 Alis Vidūnas (1934–2009), mayor of Vilnius
 Jonas Vileišis (1872–1942), politician, lawyer
 Petras Vileišis (1851–1926), millionaire, mecenate, politician, publisher
 Zygmunt Vogel (1764–1826), Polish painter
 Giedrė Voverienė (born 1968), orienteering competitor
 Vytautas the Great (1344–1430), Grand Duke of Lithuania.
 Mindaugas Vaitkūnas (born 1997), mixed martial artist

W
 Chaim Weizmann (1874–1952), Zionist politician and the first president of Israel
 Jan Kazimierz Wilczyński (1806–1885), archaeologist
 Antoni Wiwulski (1877–1919), sculptor and architect
 Tadeusz Wróblewski (1858–1925), lawyer, collector

Y
 Dov Yaffe (1928–2017), rabbi

Z
 Ludwik Zamenhof (1859–1917), philologist, creator of Esperanto
 Tomasz Zan (1796–1855), poet
Alexander Zass (1888-1962) strongman
 Aleksander Zawadzki (1859–1926), political and educational activist 
 Yitzhak Zuckerman (1915–1981), one of the leaders of the Warsaw Ghetto Uprising
 Robertas Žulpa (born 1960), swimmer, Olympic champion
 Artūras Zuokas (born 1968), mayor of Vilnius city municipality (2000–2007 and 2011–2015), Lithuanian politician

References 

 
Vilnius
Vilnius
People